Kevin Hareyama (born January 14, 1993) is a Japanese professional basketball player who plays for Shiga Lakestars of the B.League in Japan. He played college basketball for Tokai University.

Non-FIBA Events Stats

|-
|style="text-align:left;"|2013
|style="text-align:left;"|Universiade
| 6 ||  || 11.51 || .261 || .250 || .857 || 2.7 || 0.5 || 0.7 || 0 || 4.0
|-
|style="text-align:left;"|2015
|style="text-align:left;"|Universiade
| 8 ||  || 20.51 || .338 || .344 || .000 || 3.1 || 1.0 || 1.0 || 0.1 || 6.9
|-

Career statistics

Regular season 

|-
| align="left" |  2014-15
| align="left" | Toshiba
| 10|| 1|| 5.9|| .316|| .125||.000 || 1.0|| 0.3|| 0.2|| 0.0||  1.3
|-
| align="left" | 2015-16
| align="left" | Toshiba
| 40|| 6|| 11.6|| .401|| .385|| .667|| 0.9|| 0.2|| 0.4|| 0.1|| 4.2
|-
| align="left" | 2016-17
| align="left" | Kawasaki
| 32|| 6|| 5.7|| .310|| .231|| .917|| 0.5|| 0.1|| 0.1|| 0.0||  1.8
|-
| align="left" |2017-18
| align="left" | Kyoto
| 59|| 44|| 17.5|| .401|| .383|| .741|| 2.5|| 0.4|| 0.4|| 0.1||  5.5
|-
| align="left" |2018-19
| align="left" | Kyoto
| 60|| 60|| 28.2|| .411|| .369|| .809|| 3.6|| 1.2|| 0.5|| 0.1||  7.8
|-
|}

Playoffs 

|-
|style="text-align:left;"|2017-18
|style="text-align:left;"|Kyoto
| 2 || 2 || 22.00 || .600 || .500 || 1.000 || 4.0 || 0.5 || 0 || 0 || 5.0
|-

References

External links

1993 births
Living people
Chiba Jets Funabashi players
Tokai University alumni
Kawasaki Brave Thunders players
Kyoto Hannaryz players
Japanese men's basketball players
Sportspeople from Iwate Prefecture
Small forwards
Toyama Grouses players